Torymidae is a family of wasps in the superfamily Chalcidoidea. Most species in this family are small with attractive metallic coloration, and females generally have long ovipositors. Many are parasitoids on gall-forming insects, and some are phytophagous (plant-eating) species, sometimes using the galls formed by other insects. Over 960 species in about 70 genera are found worldwide. They are best recognized in that they are one of the few groups of Chalcidoidea in which the cerci are visible.

Systematics
The family was first described by Walker in 1833 and the infrafamiliar classification has been revised several times. A number of subfamilies were created within Torymidae, some of which have since been transferred to other families (Idarninae, Sycophaginae, Epichrysomallinae, and Ormyrinae), leaving the family with up to six subfamilies, although as few as two in other classifications.

Megastigminae
Monodontomerinae
Toryminae
Podagrioninae
Erimerinae (=Microdontomerinae)
Thaumatoryminae

A phylogenetic analysis in 2018 found that Torymidae as then circumscribed was not monophyletic. The subfamily Megastigminae recovered outside the clades contain the other subfamilies and elevated to family Megastignidae in a taxonomic revision. The subfamilies and tribes of Torymidae were also revised.

References 

 Grissell, E.E., 1995. Toryminae (Hymenoptera: Chalcidoidea: Torymidae): a redefinition, generic classification and annotated world catalogue of species. Memoirs on Entomology, International 2:474pp.

External links 
 
 Universal Chalcidoidea Database
 Bug Guide
 Torymidae at Waspweb
 Family description and images
 OzAnimals - Mantis Parasitic Wasp
 Megastigmus transvaalensis, Brazilian peppertree seed chalcid on the UF / IFAS  Featured Creatures Web site

Chalcidoidea
Apocrita families
Biological pest control wasps
 

Insects described in 1833
Taxa named by Francis Walker (entomologist)